Harshit Rathod (born 3 August 1998) is an Indian cricketer. He made his List A debut on 24 February 2021, for Odisha in the 2020–21 Vijay Hazare Trophy. He made his Twenty20 debut on 9 November 2021, for Odisha in the 2021–22 Syed Mushtaq Ali Trophy.

References

External links
 

1998 births
Living people
Indian cricketers
Odisha cricketers
Place of birth missing (living people)